Daniel Solomon (born 1945) is an abstract painter who uses intense, vibrant colour in his work, combined with complex, pictorial space, inspired by artists such as Jack Bush. Critics suggest that he and artists such as David Bolduc formed a bridge between the second and third generations of Toronto modernists or even form part of the third generation of Toronto abstract painters which includes artists such as Alex Cameron and Paul Sloggett.

Biography 
Solomon was born in Topeka, Kansas but grew up in Salem, Oregon, through high school. In 1963, he went to the University of Oregon to study architecture and, as part of that program, took drawing, painting and sculpture. In 1967, he immigrated to Canada, to Toronto, where, in 1970, he began teaching at the Ontario College of Art. Paul Sloggett was a student in the first class that he taught.
 
Solomon found his signature style in 1970 when he learned to trust the movement of his own body to create the visual handwriting in his paintings. He varied his work of the early 1970s to create paintings that are pattern pictures, pared-down canvases, or paintings that use over-scaled brushstrokes that float across the canvas, a motif he continues to favour.

By the mid-1970s, Solomon was featured, usually along with David Bolduc, in the shows which drew together significant groupings of Toronto`s abstract painters, such as Canada x Ten (1974) (Art Gallery of Alberta) curated by Karen Wilkin; and David Mirvish Gallery: a Selection of Paintings in Toronto (1976) which featured Bush, along with Solomon and Bolduc.

The most important international exhibition in which Solomon`s work was featured occurred in 1977. It was called 14 Canadians: a Critic`s Choice, and the exhibition was held at the Hirshhorn Museum in Washington, DC, curated by Andrew Hudson. For the artists who participated at least, it was of primary importance.

Since then, Solomon has showed his work in numerous galleries, both in solo and group exhibitions, in Canada and internationally. In Toronto, he exhibited with David Mirvish Gallery (closed in 1977), then with Klonarides Inc., and then with Moore Gallery. In Montreal, he exhibited with Elca London Gallery. In 2020, he showed new work with Paul Sloggett at The 13th Street Gallery in Ste. Catharines, Ontario.

Solomons’s paintings and sculptures can be found in major public collections across Canada, including the Art Gallery of Ontario, Toronto, the Agnes Etherington Art Centre, Kingston, and the Robert McLaughlin Gallery, Oshawa, and he has had commissions, notably an outdoor painted mural on the Flatiron Building, Toronto (1971) and an outdoor painted metal sculpture, Martha's Vineyard, installed at the 13th Street Winery, Ste. Catharines, Ontario (2013). He has also created designs for dance and theatre sets for the duMaurier Theatre in Toronto (1992, 1998), among others.

References

Further reading 

1945 births
University of Oregon alumni
Living people
People from Topeka, Kansas
20th-century Canadian painters
20th-century American painters
Abstract painters
Academic staff of OCAD University
American emigrants to Canada
Canadian abstract artists